Rashid Mandawa (born 21 March 1996) is a Tanzanian football player who plays as a forward.

References

1996 births
Living people
Tanzanian footballers
Tanzania international footballers
Coastal Union F.C. players
Kagera Sugar F.C. players
Mwadui United F.C. players
Mtibwa Sugar F.C. players
Jwaneng Galaxy F.C. players
Botswana Defence Force XI F.C. players
TS Galaxy F.C. players
Association football forwards
Tanzanian expatriate footballers
Expatriate footballers in Botswana
Tanzanian expatriate sportspeople in Botswana
Expatriate soccer players in South Africa
Tanzanian expatriate sportspeople in South Africa
National First Division players
Tanzanian Premier League players